Clay Cross and Egstow railway station the terminus of the Ashover Light Railway and it served the Egstow area of Clay Cross, North East Derbyshire, England. The station had an unusually large nameboard (10 ft by 3 ft) which stood on the single low platform. There was a wooden station building consisting of an open-fronted wooden shelter, which had the manager's office on one side, and on the other what was intended as a parcels office, but was actually used as a general storeroom. The station was the only one on the line to enjoy electric lighting. After closure in 1950. The site was demolished and is now occupied by a road called Bridge Street.

References

Disused railway stations in Derbyshire
Former London, Midland and Scottish Railway stations